Ford commonly refers to:
 Ford Motor Company, an automobile manufacturer founded by Henry Ford
 Ford (crossing), a shallow crossing on a river
Ford may also refer to:

Ford Motor Company 
 Henry Ford, founder of the Ford Motor Company
 Ford Foundation, established by Henry and Edsel
 Ford Australia
 Ford Brasil
 Changan Ford
 Ford Motor Company of Canada, Canadian subsidiary
 Ford of Britain
 Ford of Europe, the successor of British, German and Irish subsidiaries
 Ford Germany
 Ford Lio Ho
 Ford New Zealand
 Ford Motor Company Philippines
 Ford Romania
 Ford SAF, the French subsidiary between 1916 and 1954
 Ford Motor Company of South Africa
 Fordson, the tractor and truck manufacturing arm of the Ford Motor Company
 Ford Vietnam
 Ford World Rally Team (aka Ford Motor Co. Team prior to 2005), Ford Motor Company's full factory World Rally Championship team (1978–2012)
 Ford Performance
 Henry Ford & Son Ltd, Ireland
 List of Ford vehicles, models referred to as Ford

Arts and entertainment
 The Ford (painting), a 1644 painting by Claude Lorrain
 Ford, a religious figure in Aldous Huxley's Brave New World
 Ford and Mistress Ford, characters in William Shakespeare's The Merry Wives of Windsor
 Ford Cruller, a character in Psychonauts
 Ford Fairlane, a character in The Adventures of Ford Fairlane named after an automobile manufactured by the Ford Motor Company
 Ford Prefect (character), in Douglas Adams' The Hitchhiker's Guide to the Galaxy
 Kira Ford, a Power Rangers Dino Thunder character
 Judge J.J. Ford, a character in The Westing Game
 Grunkle Ford, a character in the animated series Gravity Falls

Businesses and organizations
 Ford Hospital and Research Centre, Bihar, India
 Ford Hotel, a historic hotel in central Toronto, Ontario, Canada
 Ford Instrument Company
 Ford Library (disambiguation), several libraries
 Ford Models, an American modeling agency
 The Ford Meter Box Company, an American manufacturer 
 Ford's Theatre, Washington D.C., U.S.
 Ford Tractor Company, a manufacturer of tractors in 1916–17, not related to Ford Motor Company
 Forum for the Restoration of Democracy – Asili, a Kenyan political party
 Forum for the Restoration of Democracy – Kenya, a Kenyan political party
 Forum for the Restoration of Democracy – People, a Kenyan political party

People

 Ford (surname), a surname (and list of people with the name)
 Gerald Ford, 38th president of the United States

People with the given name 
Ford Madox Brown (1821–1893), English painter
Ford Madox Ford (1873–1939), English author
Ford E. Stinson (1914–1989), Louisiana state legislator
Ford Quint Elvidge (1892–1980), second Civilian Governor of Guam
Ford Rainey (1908–2005), American actor

Places

Antarctica 
 Ford Ice Piedmont
 Ford Island (Windmill Islands)
 Ford Massif
 Ford Nunataks
 Ford Peak
 Ford Ranges
 Ford Rock
 Ford Spur

United Kingdom 
 Ford, Argyll
 Ford, Buckinghamshire
 Ford, Derbyshire

 Ford, Chivelstone, a hamlet in South Hams, Devon
 Ford, Plymouth, Devon, a suburb
 Ford, East Devon, a location in Devon
 Ford, Holbeton, a location in South Hams, Devon
 Ford, Torridge, a location in Devon
 Ford, Gloucestershire
 Ford, Herefordshire, a location
 Ford, Merseyside
 Ford (ward)
 Ford railway station (Merseyside)
 Ford, Northumberland
 Ford, Pembrokeshire, a parish of Hayscastle
 Ford, Shropshire
 Ford, Mendip, a location in Somerset
 Ford, Somerset West and Taunton, a location
 Ford, Staffordshire, a location
 Ford, West Sussex
Ford railway station
 HM Prison Ford
 Ford, North Wiltshire
 Ford, Salisbury, a hamlet of Laverstock

United States 
 Ford, Georgia
 Ford, Kansas
 Ford, Kentucky
 Ford, Virginia
 Ford, Washington
 Ford, Wisconsin
 Ford Block, a historic commercial building in Oneonta, Otsego County, New York 
 Ford Center (Evansville), an indoor arena in Evansville, Indiana
 Ford Field, a stadium in Detroit, Michigan
 Ford Hospital, active in the 1920s, Omaha, Nebraska
 Ford Island, Hawaii

Elsewhere 
 Ford, County Wexford, Ireland, a village

Sports
Ford Cup (disambiguation), in junior hockey
Ford Cup (tennis)

Other uses 
 Ford (mango), a mango cultivar from Florida
 Ford circle, in mathematics
 Ford v Quebec (AG), a landmark Supreme Court of Canada case on freedom of expression
 Douglas F4D Skyray, nicknamed Ford, an American jet fighter of the 1950s and 1960s
 , the name of several ships
 Gerald R. Ford-class aircraft carrier, or Ford-class, a group of American ships
 USS Gerald R. Ford, the lead ship of the USS Gerald R. Ford class aircraft carrier

See also 
 
 
 Fjord (disambiguation)
 Forde (disambiguation)
 Fords (disambiguation)
 Henry Ford (disambiguation)
 Fforde, a surname
 Ford High School (disambiguation)
 Ford Theatre (disambiguation)
 Ford & Lopatin, an American music group
 The Henry Ford, a museum complex on part of Henry Ford's estate in Dearborn, Michigan
 Tirtha (Jainism) (Sanskrit for "ford")
 Tirthankara (Sanskrit for "ford-maker")

English masculine given names